A replenishment oiler or replenishment tanker is a naval auxiliary ship with fuel tanks and dry cargo holds which can supply both fuel and dry stores during underway replenishment (UNREP) at sea. Many countries have used replenishment oilers.

The United States Navy's hull classification symbol for this type of ship was AOR. Replenishment oilers are slower and carry fewer dry stores than the U.S. Navy's modern fast combat support ships, which carry the classification AOE.

History

The development of the "oiler" paralleled the change from coal- to oil-fired boilers in warships. Prior to the adoption of oil fired machinery, navies could extend the range of their ships either by maintaining coaling stations or for warships to raft together with colliers and for coal to be manhandled aboard. Though arguments related to fuel security were made against such a change, the ease with which liquid fuel could be transferred led in part to its adoption by navies worldwide.

One of the first generation of "blue-water" navy oiler support vessels was the British RFA Kharki, active 1911 in the run-up to the First World War. Such vessels heralded the transition from coal to oil as the fuel of warships and removed the need to rely on, and operate within range of coaling stations. During the Second World War, the United States Navy's dramatically enlarged fleets, especially those in the Pacific Theater, required massive quantities of black oil, diesel oil, avgas, and other fuels and lubricants to support American land, sea, and air operations against remote, widely dispersed Japanese forces. Those supply demands resulted in U.S. Navy personnel refining many established practices for oilers and creating new procedures for replenishing warships while underway and for transporting highly combustible materials with increased effectiveness through hostile waters and over vast ocean distances.

Characteristics

For all but the largest navies, replenishment oilers are typically one of the largest ships in the fleet. Such ships are designed to carry large amounts of fuel and dry stores for the support of naval operations far away from port. Replenishment oilers are also equipped with more extensive medical and dental facilities than smaller ships can provide.

Such ships are equipped with multiple refueling gantries to refuel and resupply multiple ships at a time. The process of refueling and supplying ships at sea is called underway replenishment. Furthermore, such ships often are designed with helicopter decks and hangars. This allows the operation of rotary-wing aircraft, which allows the resupply of ships by helicopter. This process is called vertical replenishment. These ships, when operating in concert with surface groups, can act as an aviation maintenance platform where helicopters receive more extensive maintenance than can be provided by the smaller hangars of the escorting ships.

Their size, additional facilities, and ability to support the operation of other vessels, means that replenishment oilers have been used as command ships, with some ships, such as the French , this capability being built into the vessels from the start.

Armament
Because the replenishment oiler is not a combat unit, but rather a support vessel, such ships are often lightly armed, usually with self-defense systems (such as the Phalanx CIWS close-in weapons systems), small arms, machine guns and/or light automatic cannons. They may also carry man-portable air-defense systems for additional air defense capability.

Operators
  operates a single  purchased from France.
  operates two s.
  operates the Almirante Gastão Motta
  operates a single  purchased from the United States, and the Araucano.
  operates two Fuyu-class fast combat support ships, four Dayun-class general stores issue ships, nine Fuchi-class replenishment ships, and a single Fusu-class replenishment ship.
  operates the ROCS Wu Yi and ROCS Panshih
  operates two s, purchased from Germany.
  operates a single , purchased from Germany.
  operates three s
  operates six s, two s, and three s.
  operates a single  and two s, purchased from Germany.
  operates two s, one , and a single .
  operates a single  purchased from the United Kingdom, two Tarakan-class tankers and more on order.
  operates a single  and two s.
  operates two s.
  operates three s and two s.
  operates three s, and the ROKS Soyang
  operates HNLMS Karel Doorman
  operates  HMNZS Aotearoa.
  operates HNoMS Maud.
  operates a single Fuqing-class replenishment tanker and the PNS Moawin
  operates the BAP Tacna
  operates the ORP Bałtyk
  operates three s, one Dora-class tanker, two Uda-class tankers, one Iman-class tanker, four Altay-class tankers, three Dubna-class tankers, two Kaliningradneft-class tankers, and a single Project 23130 replenishment oiler.
  operates two s.
  operates the 
  operates the HTMS Similan
  operates two s.
  Royal Fleet Auxiliary operates one ,two s, and four s.
  United States Military Sealift Command operates 15 s, 14 s, and two s.
  operates a single  purchased from Germany
  operates the RBNV Ciudad Bolívar

Former operators

  decommissioned BRP Lake Caliraya in 2020.
  decommissioned NRP Bérrio in 2020.
  decommissioned its only  in 2001.

United States Navy oilers

In the United States Navy, an Oiler is a Combat Logistics ship that replenishes other ships with fuel and in some cases food, mail, ammunition and other necessities while at sea, in a process called Underway Replenishment or UNREP. Up through the Second World War Navy oilers used commercial tanker hulls, with the addition of UNREP gear, defensive guns, and military electronic and damage-control equipment; since the 1950s however they have been built from the keel up as specialized naval auxiliaries. They were previously classified as Fleet Oilers in the 20th Century; under the current MSC operation their full classification is listed as Fleet Replenishment Oilers. Since the 1960s the classification Transport Oiler (AOT) has applied to tankers which ship petroleum products to depots around the world, but do not engage in UNREP.

The first fleet oilers were identified by the hull designation AO, which is still in use. Large, fast multifunction oilers which also provide ammunition and dry stores are identified as Fast Combat Support Ships (AOE), and mid-size ones Replenishment Oilers (AOR). The AOR designation is no longer in use. All of these oilers provide the combined services of the AO, AE, AFS and AK.

The style "USNS" and prefix "T" identify a ship as being operated by a civilian crew under the Military Sealift Command (known as the Military Sea Transportation Service until 1970).

Current classes

There are three classes of vessels currently in commissioned service:

 Henry J. Kaiser class 
 John Lewis class
 Supply class

Both the Henry J. Kaiser-class and Supply class will be replaced by the John Lewis-class ships.

References

External links
DANFS USS KALAMAZOO (AOR-6) website
US Naval Vessel Register
KMS Dithmarschen
Spanish Navy Patino Class AOR
HMAS Success, AOR-304

Ship types